Second Reformed Dutch Church of Kingston is a historic Dutch Reformed church located at Kingston, Ulster County, New York.  It was built in 1850, and is a meeting house form church building constructed of native limestone blocks in the Gothic Revival style. It features a monumental, buttressed central entry / bell tower rising several stories to a pyramidal roof.

It was listed on the National Register of Historic Places in 2001.

See also
Old Dutch Church, the First Reformed Protestant Dutch Church of Kingston

References

External links

Churches on the National Register of Historic Places in New York (state)
Historic American Buildings Survey in New York (state)
Gothic Revival church buildings in New York (state)
Churches completed in 1850
National Register of Historic Places in Ulster County, New York